Thottakkattukara is a locality in the Aluva, Kerala, India. It is connected through all types of transportation. It is located on the banks of Aluva Puzha (Periyar River). It is just located near the Manappuram Mahadeva Temple at Manappuram, Aluva.

References 

Cities and towns in Ernakulam district